Chirnogeni is a commune in Constanța County, Northern Dobruja, Romania.

The commune includes two villages:
 Chirnogeni (historical name: Ghiuvenlia), named after Chirnogi, whence many settlers came
 Credința (historical name:  Sofular)
 Plopeni (historical name:  Cavaclar)

Demographics
At the 2011 census, Chirnogeni had 3,105 Romanians (98.98%), 26 Roma (0.83%), 4 Turks (0.13%), 2 others (0.06%).

Natives
 Şevqiy Bektöre

References

Communes in Constanța County
Localities in Northern Dobruja